Tantalum hafnium carbide is a refractory chemical compound with a general formula , which can be considered as a solid solution of tantalum carbide and hafnium carbide. It was originally thought to have the highest melting of any known substance but new research has proven this assumption to be incorrect.

Properties 

Very few measurements of melting point in tantalum hafnium carbide have been reported, because of the obvious experimental difficulties at extreme temperatures. A 1965 study of the TaC-HfC solid solutions at temperatures 2,225–2,275 °C found a minimum in the vaporization rate and thus maximum in the thermal stability for Ta4HfC5. This rate was comparable to that of tungsten and was weakly dependent on the initial density of the samples, which were sintered from TaC-HfC powder mixtures, also at 2,225–2,275 °C. In a separate study, Ta4HfC5 was found to have the minimum oxidation rate among the TaC-HfC solid solutions. Ta4HfC5 was manufactured by Goodfellow company as a 45 µm powder at a price of $9,540/kg (99.0% purity).

In 2015, atomistic simulations predicted that hafnium carbonitride could have a melting point exceeding Ta4Hf1C5 by 200 K. This was later verified by experimental evidence in 2020.

Structure 
Individual tantalum and hafnium carbides have a rocksalt cubic lattice structure. They are usually carbon deficient and have nominal formulas TaCx and HfCx, with x = 0.7–1.0 for Ta and x = 0.56–1.0 for Hf. The same structure is also observed for at least some of their solid solutions. The density calculated from X-ray diffraction data is 13.6 g/cm3 for Ta0.5Hf0.5C. Hexagonal NiAs-type structure (space group P63/mmc, No. 194, Pearson symbol hP4) with a density of 14.76 g/cm3 was reported for Ta0.9Hf0.1C0.5.

See also
 Tantalum carbide
 Hafnium carbide
 Hafnium carbonitride

References 

Refractory materials
Carbides
Tantalum compounds
Hafnium compounds